Ranavirus is a genus of viruses, in the family Iridoviridae. There are six other genera of viruses within the family Iridoviridae, but Ranavirus is the only one that includes viruses that are infectious to amphibians and reptiles. Additionally, it is one of the three genera within this family which infect teleost fishes, along with Lymphocystivirus and Megalocytivirus.

Ecological impact
The Ranaviruses, like the Megalocytiviruses, are an emerging group of closely related dsDNA viruses which cause systemic infections in a wide variety of wild and cultured fresh and saltwater fishes. As with Megalocytiviruses, Ranavirus outbreaks are therefore of considerable economic importance in aquaculture, as epizootics can result in moderate fish loss or mass mortality events of cultured fishes.  Unlike Megalocytiviruses, however, Ranavirus infections in amphibians have been implicated as a contributing factor in the global decline of amphibian populations. The impact of Ranaviruses on amphibian populations has been compared to the chytrid fungus Batrachochytrium dendrobatidis, the causative agent of chytridiomycosis. In the UK, the severity of disease outbreaks is thought to have increased due to climate change.

Etymology
Rana is derived from the Latin for "frog", reflecting the first isolation of a Ranavirus in 1960s from the Northern leopard frog (Lithobates pipiens).

Evolution
 
The ranaviruses appear to have evolved from a fish virus which subsequently infected amphibians and reptiles.

Hosts

Anuran Hosts
Wood frogs (Lithobates sylvaticus) 
American Bullfrog (Lithobates catesbieanus)
Pickerel Frog

Urodelan Hosts

Reptilian Hosts

Green pythons (Chondropython viridis)
Burmese star tortoises (Geochelone platynota)
Leopard tortoise (Geochelone pardalis)
Gopher tortoises (Gopherus polyphemus)
Mountain lizard (Lacerta monticola)
Eastern box turtles (Terrapene carolina carolina)
Florida box turtles (Terrapene carolina bauri)
Western ornate box turtles (Terrapene ornata)
Spur-thighed tortoises (Testudo graeca)
Hermann's tortoises (Testudo hermanni)
Egyptian tortoises (Testudo kleinmanni)
Russian tortoises (Testudo horsfieldii)
Marginated tortoises (Testudo marginata)
Red-eared sliders (Trachemys scripta elegans)
Common snapping turtles (Chelydra serpentina)
Chinese softshell turtles (Pelodiscus sinensis)
Common flat-tail gecko (Uroplatus fimbriatus)
Eastern Fence Lizard (Sceloporus undulatus)

Taxonomy
The genus contains the following species:
Ambystoma tigrinum virus
Common midwife toad virus
Epizootic haematopoietic necrosis virus
European North Atlantic ranavirus
Frog virus 3
Santee-Cooper ranavirus
Singapore grouper iridovirus

The family Iridoviridae is divided into seven genera which include Chloriridovirus, Iridovirus, Lymphocystivirus, Megalocytivirus, and Ranavirus.  The genus Ranavirus  contains three viruses known to infect amphibians (Ambystoma tigrinum virus (ATV), Bohle iridovirus (BIV), and frog virus 3).

Structure
Ranaviruses are large icosahedral DNA viruses measuring approximately 150 nm in diameter with a large single linear dsDNA genome of roughly 105 kbp   which codes for around 100 gene products.    The main structural component of the protein capsid is the major capsid protein (MCP).

Replication
Ranaviral replication is well-studied using Frog virus 3 (FV3).  Replication of FV3 occurs between 12 and 32 degrees Celsius.  Ranaviruses enter the host cell by receptor-mediated endocytosis.  Viral particles are uncoated and subsequently move into the cell nucleus, where viral DNA replication begins via a virally encoded DNA polymerase.  Viral DNA then abandons the cell nucleus and begins the second stage of DNA replication in the cytoplasm, ultimately forming DNA concatemers.  The viral DNA is then packaged via a headful mechanism into infectious virions.  The ranavirus genome, like other iridoviral genomes is circularly permuted and exhibits terminally redundant DNA.
There is evidence that ranavirus infections target macrophages as a mechanism for gaining entry to cells.

Transmission
Transmission of ranaviruses is thought to occur by multiple routes, including contaminated soil, direct contact, waterborne exposure, and ingestion of infected tissues during predation, necrophagy or cannibalism.
Ranaviruses are relatively stable in aquatic environments, persisting several weeks or longer outside a host organism.

Epizoology
Amphibian mass mortality events due to Ranavirus have been reported in Asia, Europe, North America, and South America.  Ranaviruses have been isolated from wild populations of amphibians in Australia, but have not been associated with mass mortality on that continent.

Pathogenesis
Synthesis of viral proteins begins within hours of viral entry with necrosis or apoptosis occurring as early as a few hours post-infection.

Seasonal Disease Dynamics 
There are several hypothesis for seasonal outbreak patterns observed for Ranavirosis mortality events. Ranaviruses grow in vitro between 8-30 °C, however for most isolates, warmer temperature result in faster viral replication. A combination of this optimal growth temperature along with shifts in larval amphibian susceptibility result in seasonal outbreak events most often observed during warm summer months. Amphibian mortality events are often observed as larval amphibians reach late Gosner stages approaching metamorphosis. As larval amphibians reach metamorphic stages of development, their immune system is reorganized prior to the development of adult tissues. During this time period, amphibians are stressed, and their immune systems are down regulated. This decrease in immune function and warmer environmental temperatures allows for greater viral replication and cellular damage to occur. Across 64 mortality events in the United States 54% were found to occur between June-August.

Environmental Persistence
The environmental persistence of Ranaviruses is not understood well, however in realistic environmental conditions the T90 value of an FV3-like virus is 1 day. The duration of persistence is likely affected by temperature and microbial conditions. It is unlikely that ranaviruses persist in the environment outside of host species between outbreak events. 
Researchers have explored several pathogen reservoirs for the virus which might explain how the virus can persist within an amphibian community. In some amphibian populations, sub-clinically infected individuals may serve as reservoirs for the pathogen. These sub-clinically infected individuals are responsible for reintroduction of the virus to the larval population. With ranaviruses being capable of infected multiple taxa, and with there being differences in susceptibility between taxa, it is likely that sympatric fish and reptile species may serve as reservoirs for virus as well. Interclass transmission has been proven through the use of mesocosm studies.

Gross pathology
Gross lesions associated with Ranavirus infection include erythema, generalized swelling, hemorrhage, limb swelling, and swollen and friable livers.

See also
Decline in amphibian populations

References

External links

 ICTV Online (10th) Report: Iridoviridae
 Viralzone: Ranavirus
 Global Ranavirus Consortium
 Viral Diseases of Amphibians
 More information on Ranavirus  and other pathogens impacting amphibian populations, including Batrachochytrium dendrobatidis and Batrachochytrium salamandrivorans can be found at the Southeast Partners in Amphibian and Reptile Conservation disease task team web-page. 

Iridoviridae
Fish viral diseases
Articles containing video clips
Virus genera